The American Fern Journal is a quarterly peer-reviewed academic journal published by the American Fern Society. It is a specialized botany journal that covers all aspects of ferns and vascular plants.

References

External links
American Fern Society

Botany journals